"This Time Around" is a song by American singer Michael Jackson from his ninth studio album, HIStory: Past, Present and Future, Book I, with a guest appearance by rapper the Notorious B.I.G. It was released as a promotional single in the US, and is the album's fourth single overall. The song, which details a musician's problems with being famous and dealing with stardom, was written by Jackson, while the music was composed by Dallas Austin, Bruce Swedien and Rene Moore. Dallas Austin and Michael Jackson produced the song, while Bruce Swedien and René Moore served as co-producers. In the United States, "This Time Around" entered three Billboard component charts, respectively peaking at numbers 18, 23, and 36 on the Dance Music/Club Play Singles, Hot R&B/Hip-Hop Airplay, and Rhythmic Top 40, having charted solely due to radio airplay throughout the country. It received positive reviews from contemporary music critics.

Background and composition 
The song and lyrics were written by Michael Jackson, while the music was composed by Dallas Austin, Bruce Swedien and Rene Moore. "This Time Around" is a song by Jackson that includes vocals by rapper the Notorious B.I.G. Austin and Jackson produced the song, while Swedien and Moore co-produced the song. It was recorded by both American musicians in 1994 and 1995 for Jackson's ninth studio album, entitled HIStory: Past, Present and Future, Book I, which was released in 1995 as a two-disc set.

"This Time Around" was written in common time, and was played in the key of D minor. The track's tempo is a moderate 106 beats per minute. The track has a basic sequence of Dm11–Dm9 as its chord progression. The song's lyrics are about Michael and Biggie's problems with being famous and dealing with stardom, and throughout the song Jackson asserts that he's been falsely accused as Biggie compares his issues and sympathizes with Jackson. On December 26, 1995, the track was released by Epic Records as a promotional single in the United States only. The promo was formatted in three different versions, which were as a standalone CD single with just the song, as a 12" single with remixes and as a maxi-single.

Release and reception
"This Time Around" received positive reviews from contemporary music critics in their review for the album. James Hunter of Rolling Stone described the song as being a "dynamite jam...done with Atlanta R&B hotshot Dallas Austin that's ripe for remixes". Jon Pareles of The New York Times believed that Jackson "muttered" lyrics such as "They thought they really had control of me". Although "This Time Around" did not chart on the Billboard Hot 100, the track had a good chart performance on music component charts in the United States. The song charted on music charts based solely on radio airplay throughout the country. It charted within the top 40 of the Billboard Rhythmic Top 40 chart in 1995, peaking at number 36. The song peaked at number 18 on the Billboard Dance Music/Club Play Singles music charts 1996. In 1996, the track also peaked at number 23 on the Billboard Hot R&B/Hip-Hop Songs chart.

Track listings
US CD Promo 
 "This Time Around" – 4:21
 "Earth Song (Radio Edit)" – 4:58
 "Earth Song" – 6:46
US 12" Promo 
 "This Time Around (Dallas Main Extended Mix)" – 7:15
 "This Time Around (Maurice's Hip Hop Around Mix)" – 4:25
 "This Time Around (Maurice's Hip Hop Around Mix w/o Rap)" – 4:25
 "This Time Around (Dallas Main Mix)" – 6:40
 "This Time Around (Album Instrumental)" – 4:12

Remixes

David Morales Mixes
 "This Time Around (D.M. Mad Club Mix)" – 10:23
 "This Time Around (D.M. Mad Alternate Mix)" – 10:36 [Also known as "D.M. Mad Club Mix #2"]
 "This Time Around (D.M. Mad Dub)" – 8:00
 "This Time Around (D.M. Radio Mix)" – 4:05
 "This Time Around (D.M. A.M. Mix)" – 7:47
 "This Time Around (D.M. Bang Da Drums Mix)" – 6:34
 "This Time Around (The Timeland Dub)" – 7:22
 "This Time Around (The Neverland Dub)" – 7:46
Maurice Joshua Mixes
 "This Time Around (Maurice's Club Around Mix)" – 9:00
 "This Time Around (Maurice's Club Around Radio Mix)" – 4:00
 "This Time Around (Maurice's Hip Hop Around Mix)" – 4:25
 "This Time Around (Maurice's Hip Hop Around Mix w/ Drop)" - 4:18
 "This Time Around (Maurice's Hip Hop Around Mix w/o Rap)" – 4:25
Dallas Austin Mixes
 "This Time Around (Dallas Main Extended Mix)" - 7:15
 "This Time Around (Dallas Main Mix)" - 6:40
 "This Time Around (Dallas Main Mix w/o Rap)" - 6:40
 "This Time Around (Dallas Radio Remix)" – 4:31
 "This Time Around (Dallas Radio Remix w/o Rap)" – 4:31
 "This Time Around (Dallas Clean Album Remix)" – 4:21
 "This Time Around (Album Instrumental)" – 4:12
Uno Clio Mixes
 "This Time Around (Uno Clio 12" Master Mix)" – 9:25
 "This Time Around (Uno Clio Dub Mix)" – 8:06
Georgie Porgie Mixes
 "This Time Around (Georgie's House N Around Mix)" – 6:04
Joey "The Don" Donatello Mixes
 "This Time Around (The Don's Control This Dub)" – 4:30
UBQ Mix
 "This Time Around (UBQ's Opera Vibe Dub)" – 7:00
David Mitson Mix
 "This Time Around (David Mitson Clean Edit)" – 4:21

Personnel
 Produced by Michael Jackson, Dallas Austin, Bruce Swedien and René Moore
 Recorded by Bruce Swedien and René Moore
 Mixed by Bruce Swedien
 Arranged by Michael Jackson, Dallas Austin, Bruce Swedien, and René Moore
 Michael Jackson – lead and backing vocals
 The Notorious B.I.G. – rap
 Dallas Austin – keyboards and synthesizers
 René Moore – percussion, keyboards, and synthesizers
 Bruce Swedien – percussion
 Michael Thompson – guitar
 Keith Rouster and Colin Wolfe – bass guitar

Charts

References

1995 songs
1995 singles
Michael Jackson songs
The Notorious B.I.G. songs
Song recordings produced by Dallas Austin
Song recordings produced by Michael Jackson
Songs written by Michael Jackson
Songs written by Dallas Austin
Songs written by Bruce Swedien
Songs written by the Notorious B.I.G.
New jack swing songs